Chris Sugden is a Norfolk humorist, best known for his portrayal of fictional folk singer Sid Kipper, the younger half of the Kipper Family.

Personal life

Born in West Runton in 1952, Sugden initially studied pharmacy at Leicester Polytechnic before starting a PhD at the University of East Anglia. He is the author of Prewd and Prejudice (1994) in which the heroine Miriam Prewd spends a traumatic year of ‘Norfolk exile’. Written in his characteristic dead-pan style Prewd and Prejudice concerns itself with the Norfolk countryside, misconceptions about Norfolk and its self-deprecating folk. Sugden wrote that "the national papers seemed to think that it took the mickey out of country people, while the Norfolk people thought it ridiculed Londoners".

Sugden is also the author of The Cromer-Sheringham Crab Wars and the song Like a Rhinestone Ploughboy. He is the compiler of an (as yet) unpublished rhyming dictionary of Norfolk place-names for song-writing purposes. In 1996 he published The Ballad of Sid Kipper.

The Eastern Daily Press columnist Keith Skipper claimed that Sugden is "probably the county’s finest ambassador who captures the true spirit of Norfolk, teaches it tricks, then sends it to run riot across the land".

In 2006, Sugden presented a series of podcasts for Channel 4 radio called "The Kipper Country Code", as Sid Kipper.

Chris has now retired Sid Kipper from public life and an update can be found on his website. His website no longer exists, but is available via web archive.

Albums
Sid Kipper
Like A Rhinestone Ploughboy (1994)
Spineless (1997)
Boiled in the Bag (1997)
East Side Story (2000)
Cod Pieces (2002)
Chained Melody (2003)
In Season (2007)
Gutless (2011)

The Kipper Family
Since Time Immoral (1984)
The Ever Decreasing Circle (1985)
The Crab Wars (1986)
Fresh Yesterday (1988)
Arrest These Merry Gentlemen (1989)
In the Family Way (1991)
Two-Faced (2011)

Books
Prewd and Prejudice (1994)
Crab Wars (1999)
Cod Pieces (2001)
Man of Convictions (2003)
The Ballad of Sid Kipper (1996) (out of print)

External links
 Sid Kipper's website
 The Kipper Family:  Sid and Henry Kipper tribute site
 Sid Kipper at Myspace
 Garry Gillard's Kipper pages
 Sid Kipper Interview

References

1952 births
Living people
People from West Runton
Alumni of the University of East Anglia
Alumni of De Montfort University